Infonet was a Malaysian teletext service. It was formerly known as Beriteks (a combination of the Malay word Berita, meaning news, and Teks, which is a borrowed word from the English language meaning text). This teletext system was launched on 2 June 1985 by TV3. While RTM1 and RTM2 were still transmitting Teletext, the contents of the transmission were different from those offered by TV3's service, which was then also transmitted under the name Beriteks. RTM1 and RTM2 has ceased teletext transmission as of 2000, and TV3 was the only TV station in Malaysia transmitting Teletext. None of TV3's sister companies, 8TV, TV9 and NTV7, are transmitting teletext.

Infonet ceased operation from 1 January 2008. Therefore, there are now no TV stations transmitting Teletext in Malaysia.

Infonet uses the BBC Ceefax teletext system.

External links
Beriteks (1991)

1985 establishments in Malaysia
2008 disestablishments in Malaysia
Media Prima
Television in Malaysia
Teletext